Theft is the act of taking another person's property or services without that person's permission or consent with the intent to deprive the rightful owner of it. The word theft is also used as a synonym or informal shorthand term for some crimes against property, such as larceny, robbery, embezzlement, extortion, blackmail, or receiving stolen property. In some jurisdictions, theft is considered to be synonymous with larceny, while in others, theft is defined more narrowly. Someone who carries out an act of theft may be described as a "thief" (: thieves).

Theft is the name of a statutory offence in California, Canada, England and Wales, Hong Kong, Northern Ireland, the Republic of Ireland, and the Australian states of South Australia and Victoria.

Elements

The actus reus of theft is usually defined as an unauthorized taking, keeping, or using of another's property which must be accompanied by a mens rea of dishonesty and the intent to permanently deprive the owner or rightful possessor of that property or its use.

For example, if X goes to a restaurant and, by mistake, takes Y's scarf instead of her own, she has physically deprived Y of the use of the property (which is the actus reus) but the mistake prevents X from forming the mens rea (i.e., because she believes that she is the owner, she is not dishonest and does not intend to deprive the "owner" of it) so no crime has been committed at this point. But if she realizes the mistake when she gets home and could return the scarf to Y, she will steal the scarf if she dishonestly keeps it (see theft by finding). Note that there may be civil liability for the torts of trespass to chattels or conversion in either eventuality.

By jurisdiction

The following are the countries with the most cases of theft, as well as the respective rates per 100,000 people, according to the United Nations in 2018.

Australia

Actus reus

South Australia

Theft is defined in section 134 of the Criminal Consolidation Act 1935 (SA) as being where a person deals with property dishonestly, without the owner's consent and intending to deprive the owner of their property, or make a serious encroachment on the proprietary rights of the owner.

Under this law, encroachment on proprietary rights means that the property is dealt with in a way that creates a substantial risk that the property will not be returned to the owner, or that the value of the property will be greatly diminished when the owner does get it back. Also, where property is treated as the defendant's own property to dispose of, disregarding the actual property owner's rights.

For a basic offence, a person found guilty of this offence is liable for imprisonment of up to 10 years.

For an aggravated offence, a person found guilty of this offence is liable for imprisonment of up to 15 years.

Victoria

Theft is defined in the Crimes Act 1958 (Vic) as when a person "dishonestly appropriates property belonging to another with the intention of permanently depriving the other of it.". The actus reus and mens rea are defined as follows:
Appropriation is defined in section 73(4) of the Crimes Act 1958 (Vic) as the assumption of any of the owner's rights. It does not have to be all the owner's rights, as long as at least one right has been assumed. If the owner gave their consent to the appropriation there cannot be an appropriation. However, if this consent is obtained by deception, this consent is vitiated.

Property – defined in section 71(1) of the Crimes Act 1958 (Vic) as being both tangible property, including money and intangible property. Information has been held not be property.

Belonging to another – section 73(5) of the Crimes Act 1958 (Vic) provides that property belongs to another if that person has ownership, possession, or a proprietary interest in the property. Property can belong to more than one person. sections 73(9) & 73(10) deal with situations where the accused receives property under an obligation or by mistake.

Mens rea

South Australia

Whether a person's conduct is dishonest is a question of fact to be determined by the jury, based on their own knowledge and experience. As with the definition in Victoria, it contains definitions of what is not dishonesty, including a belief in a legal claim of right or a belief the owner could not be found.

Victoria

Intention to permanently deprive – defined at s.73(12) as treating property as it belongs to the accused, rather than the owner.

Dishonestly –  section 73(2) of the Crimes Act 1958 (Vic) creates a negative definition of the term 'dishonestly'. The section deems only three circumstances when the accused is deemed to have been acting honestly. These are a belief in a legal claim of right, a belief that the owner would have consented, or a belief the owner could not be found.

Canada

Section 322(1) of the Criminal Code provides the general definition for theft in Canada:

Sections 323 to 333 provide for more specific instances and exclusions:

 theft from oyster beds (s. 323)
 theft by bailee of things under seizure (s. 324)
 exception when agent is pledging goods (s. 325)
 theft of telecommunications service (s. 326)
 possession of device to obtain telecommunication facility or service (s. 327)
 theft by or from person having special property or interest (s. 328)
 theft by person required to account (s. 330)
 theft by person holding power of attorney (s. 331)
 misappropriation of money held under direction (s. 332)
 exception for ore taken for exploration or scientific research (s. 333)

In the general definition above, the Supreme Court of Canada has construed "anything" very broadly, stating that it is not restricted to tangibles, but includes intangibles. To be the subject of theft it must, however:

 be property of some sort;
 be property capable of being
 taken (therefore intangibles are excluded); or
 converted (and may be an intangible);
 taken or converted in a way that deprives the owner of his/her proprietary interest in some way.

Because of this, confidential information cannot be the subject of theft, as it is not capable of being taken as only tangibles can be taken. It cannot be converted, not because it is an intangible, but because, save in very exceptional far‑fetched circumstances, the owner would never be deprived of it. However, the theft of trade secrets in certain circumstances does constitute part of the offence of economic espionage, which can be prosecuted under s. 19 of the Security of Information Act.

For the purposes of punishment, Section 334 divides theft into two separate offences, according to the value and nature of the goods stolen:

 If the thing stolen is worth more than $5000 or is a testamentary instrument the offence is commonly referred to as Theft Over $5000 and is an indictable offence with a maximum punishment of 10 years imprisonment.
Where the stolen item is not a testamentary instrument and is not worth more than $5000 it is known as Theft Under $5000 and is a hybrid offence, meaning that it can be treated either as an indictable offense or a less serious summary conviction offence, depending on the choice of the prosecutor.
 if dealt with as an indictable offence, it is punishable by imprisonment for not more than 2 years, and,
 if treated as a summary conviction offence, it is punishable by 6 months imprisonment, a fine of $2000 or both.

Where a motor vehicle is stolen, Section 333.1 provides for a maximum punishment of 10 years for an indictable offence (and a minimum sentence of six months for a third or subsequent conviction), and a maximum sentence of 18 months on summary conviction.

Hong Kong
Section 2 of the Theft Ordinance provides the general definition of theft in Hong Kong:

The elements of this offence in Hong Kong is almost the same as in England and Wales, because the Theft Ordinance in Hong Kong was drafted based on the Theft Act 1968 (and the Theft Act 1978) in UK. However, the "Ghosh Test" for dishonest in Hong Kong has been replaced by the "Ivey Test" in England and Wales by the Supreme Court. It is the main difference between the offence of theft in these two jurisdictions.

India
Theft is a criminal activity in India with punishments which may lead to jail term. Below are excerpts of laws of Indian penal Code which state definitions and punishments for theft.

 Section 378 – Theft.
Whoever intending to take dishonestly any movable property out of the possession of any person without that person’s consent, moves that property in order to such taking is said to commit theft.
Explanation 1.—A thing so long as it is attached to the earth, not being movable property, is not the subject of theft; but it becomes capable of being the subject of theft as soon as it is severed from the earth.
Explanation 2.—A moving effected by the same act which effects the severance may be a theft.
Explanation 3.—A person is said to cause a thing to move by removing an obstacle which prevented it from moving or by separating it from any other thing, as well as by actually moving it.
Explanation 4.—A person, who by any means causes an animal to move, is said to move that animal, and to move everything which, in consequence of the motion so caused, is moved by that animal.
Explanation 5.—The consent mentioned in the definition may be express or implied, and may be given either by the person in possession, or by any person having for that purpose authority either express or implied.
 Section 379 – Punishment for theft.
Whoever commits theft shall be punished with imprisonment of either description for a term which may extend to three years, or with fine, or with both.
 Section 380 – Theft in dwelling house, etc.
Whoever commits theft in any building, tent or vessel, which building, tent or vessel is used as a human dwelling, or used for the custody of property, shall be punished with imprisonment of either description for a term which may extend to seven years, and shall also be liable to fine.
 Section 381 - Theft by clerk or servant of property in possession of master.
Whoever, being a clerk or servant, or being employed in the capacity of a clerk or servant, commits theft in respect of any property in the possession of his master or employer, shall be punished with imprisonment of either description for a term which may extend to seven years, and shall also be liable to fine.
 Section 382 – Theft after preparation made for causing death, hurt or restraint in order to the committing of the theft.	 
Whoever commits theft, having made preparation for causing death, or hurt, or restraint, or fear of death, or of hurt, or of restraint, to any person, in order to the committing of such theft, or in order to the effecting of his escape after the committing of such theft, or in order to the retaining of property taken by such theft, shall be punished with rigorous imprisonment for a term which may extend to ten years, and shall also be liable to fine.

The Netherlands
Theft is a crime with related articles in the Wetboek van Strafrecht.
 Article 310 prohibits theft (Dutch: diefstal), which is defined as taking away any object that (partly) belongs to someone else, with the intention to appropriate it illegally. Maximum imprisonment is 4 years or a fine of the fifth category.
 Article 311 consists of the following:
 Part 1. Punishable with maximum imprisonment of 6 years or a fine of the fourth category is:
 1. Theft of cattle;
 2. Theft during certain emergency occasions;
 3. Theft during night in a residence by someone who is there without knowledge or permission of the owner;
 4. Theft by 2 or more organized people;
 5. Theft, where the thief got access by means of violence, climbing in, using false keys or disguise;
 6. Terroristic theft.
 Part 2. When theft if committed as in 3 with the situation of 4 and 5, the punishment is a maximum imprisonment of 9 years or a fine of the fifth category.
 Article 312 consists of the following:
 Part 1 prohibits robbery (Dutch: beroving), which is defined as taking away any object with violence or with threat of violence. Maximum imprisonment is 9 years or a fine with the fifth category
 Part 2 allows maximum imprisonment of 12  years or a fine of the fifth category when:
 1. Robbery was committed during night, in a residence, on the public road or moving train;
 2. Robbery was committed by 2 or more people;
 3. Robbery was committed by violence, climbing in, false key or disguise;
 4. Robbery caused severe injury;
 5. Robbery was terroristic.
 Part 3 allows maximum imprisonment of 15 years instead of 12 when robbery caused death to the victim.
 Article 314 consists of the following:
 Part 1 prohibits poaching (Dutch: stroperij), which is defined as taking away without violence the following: clay, sand, earth, raw wood, fallen vegetables (see the source for a complete list). Maximum imprisonment is one month or a fine of the second category.
 Part 2 increases the maximum imprisonment to 2 months when the crime is committed again less than 2 years after the first time.
 Article 315 increases the maximum imprisonment and fine category when poaching is done with vehicles and draft animals. Maximum imprisonment is 3 years or a fine of the fourth category.

Republic of Ireland
Theft is a statutory offence, created by section 4(1) of the Criminal Justice (Theft and Fraud Offences) Act 2001.

Romania
According to the Romanian Penal Code a person committing theft (furt) can face a penalty ranging from 1 to 20 years.

Degrees of theft:
 Article 208: Theft (1 to 12 years)—When a person steals an object, or uses a vehicle without permission and no aggravating circumstances apply.
 Article 209: Qualified theft (3 to 20 years)
Aggravating circumstances (3 to 15 years): a) by two or more persons together; b) by a person in possession of a gun or a narcotic substance; c) by a masked or disguised person; d) against a person who cannot defend his or herself; e) in a public place; f) in a public transportation vehicle; g) during nighttime; h) during a natural disaster; i) through burglary, or by using an original or copied key; j) stealing national treasures; k) stealing official identity papers with the intention to make use of them; l) stealing official identity badges with the intention to make use of them.

Aggravating circumstances (4 to 18 years): a) stealing petrol-based products directly from transportation pipes and vehicles or deposits; b) stealing components from national electrification, telecommunication, irrigation networks or from any type of navigational system; c) stealing a siren; d) stealing a public intervention vehicle or device; e) stealing something which jeopardizes the safety of public transportation.

Aggravating circumstances (10 to 20 years): when the consequences are extremely grave and affect public institutions or the material stolen is worth over 200,000 RON (approximately US$80,000).

United Kingdom

England and Wales
In England and Wales, theft is a statutory offence, created by section 1(1) of the Theft Act 1968. This offence replaces the former offences of larceny, embezzlement and fraudulent conversion.

The marginal note to section 1 of the Theft Act 1968 describes it as a "basic definition" of theft. Sections 1(1) and (2) provide:

1.-(1) A person is guilty of theft, if he dishonestly appropriates property belonging to another with the intention of permanently depriving the other of it; and "thief" and "steal" shall be construed accordingly.
(2) It is immaterial whether the appropriation is made with a view to gain, or is made for the thief’s own benefit.

Sections 2 to 6 of the Theft Act 1968 have effect as regards the interpretation and operation of section 1 of that Act. Except as otherwise provided by that Act, sections 2 to 6 of that Act apply only for the purposes of section 1 of that Act.

Appropriates
Section 3 provides:

See R v Hinks and Lawrence v Metropolitan Police Commissioner.

Property
Section 4(1) provides that:

Edward Griew said that section 4(1) could, without changing its meaning, be reduced, by omitting words, to:

Sections 4(2) to (4) provide that the following can only be stolen under certain circumstances:
 Land or things forming part of land and severed from it (s. 4(2))
 Mushrooms growing wild on any land, or the flowers, fruit or foliage of plants growing wild on any land (s. 4(3))
 Wild creatures or the carcases of wild creatures (s. 4(4))

Intangible property

Confidential information and trade secrets are not property within the meaning of section 4.

The words "other intangible property" include export quotas that are transferable for value on a temporary or permanent basis.

Electricity

Electricity cannot be stolen. It is not property within the meaning of section 4 and is not appropriated by switching on a current. Cf. the offence of abstracting electricity under section 13.

Belonging to another
Section 5 "belonging to another" requires a distinction to be made between ownership, possession and control:
 ownership is where a person is not legally accountable to anyone else for the use of the property:
 possession is where a person is only accountable to the owner for the use of the property; and
 control is where a person is only accountable to two people for the use of the property.

So if A buys a car for cash, A will be the owner. If A then lends the car to B Ltd (a company), B Ltd will have possession. C, an employee of B Ltd then uses the car and has control. If C uses the car in an unauthorized way, C will steal the car from A and B Ltd. This means that it is possible to steal one's own property.

In R v Turner, the owner removed his car from the forecourt of a garage where it had been left for collection after repair. He intended to avoid paying the bill. There was an appropriation of the car because it had been physically removed but there were two issues to be decided:
 did the car "belong to another"? The garage had a lien i.e. a "proprietary right or interest" in the car as security for the unpaid bill and this gave the garage a better right than the owner to possess the car at the relevant time.
 what was the relevance of Turner's belief that he could not steal his own property? The defence of mistake of law only applies if the defendant honestly believes that he has a right in law to act in the given way. Generalized and non-specific beliefs about what the law might permit are not a defence.

With the intention of permanently depriving the other of it
Section 6 "with the intent to permanently deprive the other of it" is sufficiently flexible to include situations where the property is later returned.

Alternative verdict

The offense created by section 12(1) of the Theft Act 1968 (TWOC) is available an alternative verdict on an indictment for theft.

Visiting forces

Theft is an offence against property for the purposes of section 3 of the Visiting Forces Act 1952.

Mode of trial and sentence

Theft is triable either way. A person guilty of theft is liable, on conviction on indictment, to imprisonment for a term not exceeding seven years, or on summary conviction to imprisonment for a term not exceeding six months, or to a fine not exceeding the prescribed sum, or to both.

Aggravated theft

The only offence of aggravated theft is robbery, contrary to section 8 of the Theft Act 1968.

Stolen goods

For the purposes of the provisions of the Theft Act 1968 which relate to stolen goods, goods obtain in England or Wales or elsewhere by blackmail or fraud are regarded as stolen, and the words "steal", "theft" and "thief" are construed accordingly.

Sections 22 to 24 and 26 to 28 of the Theft Act 1968 contain references to stolen goods.

Handling stolen goods

The offence of handling stolen goods, contrary to section 22(1) of the Theft Act 1968, can only be committed "otherwise than in the course of stealing".

Similar or associated offences

According to its title, the Theft Act 1968 revises the law as to theft and similar or associated offences. See also the Theft Act 1978.

Northern Ireland
In Northern Ireland, theft is a statutory offence, created by section 1 of the Theft Act (Northern Ireland) 1969.

United States

In the United States, crimes must be prosecuted in the jurisdiction in which they occurred. Although federal and state jurisdiction may overlap, even when a criminal act violates both state and federal law, in most cases only the most serious offenses are prosecuted at the federal level.

The federal government has criminalized certain narrow categories of theft that directly affect federal agencies or interstate commerce. The Model Penal Code, promulgated by the American Law Institute to help state legislatures update and standardize their laws, includes categories of theft by unlawful taking or by unlawfully disposing of property, theft by deception (fraud), theft by extortion, theft by failure to take measures to return lost or mislaid or mistakenly delivered property, theft by receipt of stolen property, theft by failing to make agreed disposition of received funds, and theft of services.

Although many U.S. states have retained larceny as the primary offense, some have now adopted theft provisions.

Grand theft, also called grand larceny, is a term used throughout the United States designating theft that is large in magnitude or serious in potential penological consequences. Grand theft  is contrasted with petty theft, also called petit theft, that is of smaller magnitude or lesser seriousness.

Theft laws, including the distinction between grand theft and petty theft for cases falling within its jurisdiction, vary by state.  This distinction is established by statute, as are the penological consequences.  Most commonly, statutes establishing the distinction between grand theft and petty theft do so on the basis of the value of the money or property taken by the thief or lost by the victim, with the dollar threshold for grand theft varying from state to state. Most commonly, the penological consequences of the distinction include the significant one that grand theft can be treated as a felony, while petty theft is generally treated as a misdemeanor.

In some states, grand theft of a vehicle may be charged as "grand theft auto" (see motor vehicle theft for more information).

Repeat offenders who continue to steal may become subject to life imprisonment in certain states.

Sometimes the federal anti-theft-of-government-property law  is used to prosecute cases where the Espionage Act would otherwise be involved; the theory being that by retaining sensitive information, the defendant has taken a 'thing of value' from the government. For examples, see the Amerasia case and United States v. Manning.

Alabama 
When stolen property exceeds the amount of $500 it is a felony offense. If property is less than $500, then it is a Class A misdemeanor. Unlike some other states, shoplifting is not defined by a separate statute but falls under the state's general theft statute.

Alaska
The Alaska State Code does not use the terms grand theft or grand larceny.  However, it specifies that theft of property valued at more than $1,000 is a felony whereas thefts of lesser amounts are misdemeanors.  The felony categories (class 1 and class 2 theft) also include theft of firearms; property taken from the person of another; vessel or aircraft safety or survival equipment; and of access devices.

Arizona
Felony theft is committed when the value of the stolen property exceeds $1000. Regardless of the value of the item, if it is a firearm or an animal taken for the purpose of animal fighting, then the theft is a Class 6 Felony.

California
The Theft Act of 1927 consolidated a variety of common law crimes into theft.  The state now distinguishes between two types of theft, grand theft and petty theft. The older crimes of embezzlement, larceny, and stealing, and any preexisting references to them now fall under the theft statute.

There are a number of criminal statutes in the California Penal Code defining grand theft in different amounts. Grand theft generally consists of the theft of something of value over $950 (including money, labor or property but is lower with respect to various specified property), Theft is also considered grand theft when more than $250 in crops or marine life forms are stolen, “when the property is taken from the person of another,” or when the property stolen is an automobile, farm animal, or firearm.

Petty theft is the default category for all other thefts.

Grand theft is punishable by up to a year in jail or prison, and may be charged (depending upon the circumstances) as a misdemeanor or felony, while petty theft is a misdemeanor punishable by a fine or imprisonment not exceeding six months in jail or both.

Florida
In general, any property taken that carries a value of more than $750 can be considered grand theft in certain circumstances.

Georgia
In Georgia, when a theft offense involves property valued at $500 or less, the crime is punishable as a misdemeanor. Any theft of property determined to be exceeding $500 may be treated as grand theft and charged as a felony.

Hawaii
Theft in the first or second degree is a felony. Theft in the first degree means theft above $20,000 or of a firearm or explosive; or theft over $300 during a declared emergency. Theft in the second degree means theft above $750, theft from the person of another, or agricultural products over $100 or aquacultural products from an enclosed property.

Illinois
Theft is a felony if the value of the property exceeds $300 or the property is stolen from the person of another. Thresholds at $10,000, $100,000, and $500,000 determine how severe the punishment can be. The location from which property was stolen is also a factor in sentencing.

Kentucky
KRS 514.030 states that theft by unlawful taking or disposition is generally a Class A misdemeanor unless the items stolen are a firearm, anhydrous ammonia, a controlled substance valued at less than $10,000 or any other item or combination of items valued $500 or higher and less than $10,000 in which case the theft is a Class D felony. Theft of items valued at $10,000 or higher and less than $1,000,000 is a Class C felony. Theft of items valued at $1,000,000 or more is a Class B felony, as is first offense theft of anhydrous ammonia for the express purpose of manufacturing methamphetamines in violation of KRS 218A.1432. In the latter case, subsequent offenses are a Class A felony.

Massachusetts
In Massachusetts, theft may generally be charged as a felony if the value of stolen property is greater than $250.

Missouri
Stealing is a felony if the value of stolen property exceeds $500. It is also a felony if "The actor physically takes the property appropriated from the person of the victim" or the stolen property is a vehicle, legal document, credit card, firearm, explosive, U.S. flag on display, livestock animal, fish with value exceeding $75, captive wildlife, controlled substance, or anhydrous ammonia. Stealing in excess of $25,000 is usually a class B felony (sentence: 5–15 years), while any other felony stealing (not including the felonies of burglary or robbery) that does not involve chemicals is a class C felony (sentence: up to 7 years). Non-felony stealing is a class A misdemeanor (sentence: up to 1 year).

New York
Grand larceny consists of stealing property with a value exceeding $1000; or stealing a public record, secret scientific material, firearm, credit or debit card, ammonia, telephone with service, or motor vehicle or religious item with value exceeding $100; or stealing from the person of another or by extortion or from an ATM. The degree of grand larceny is increased if the theft was from an ATM, through extortion involving fear, or involved a value exceeding the thresholds of $3,000, $50,000, or $1,000,000.

Vermont
Grand Larceny:
Value of goods exceed $900 (13 V.S.A. § 2501)

Virginia
Grand Larceny:
Value of goods exceed $1000 (Virginia Code § 18.2-95)

Washington State
Theft of goods valued between $750 and $5000 is second-degree theft, a Class C felony.  Theft of goods valued above $5000, of a search-and-rescue dog on duty, of public records from a public office or official, of metal wire from a utility, or of an access device, is a Class  B felony, as is theft of
a motor vehicle 
or a firearm.

West Indies
In the British West Indies, especially Grenada, there have been a spate of large-scale thefts of tons of sand from beaches.  Both Grenada and Jamaica are considering increasing fines and jail time for the thefts.

Religious views and practices

Islam 

In parts of the world which govern with sharia law, the punishment for theft is amputation of the right hand if the thief does not repent. This ruling is derived from surah 5 verse 38 of the Quran which states As to the thief, Male or female, cut off his or her hands: a punishment by way of example, from Allah, for their crime: and Allah is Exalted in power. This is viewed as being a deterrent.

Buddhism 
In Buddhism, one of the five precepts prohibits theft, and involves the intention to steal what one perceives as not belonging to oneself ("what is not given") and acting successfully upon that intention. The severity of the act of theft is judged by the worth of the owner and the worth of that which is stolen. Underhand dealings, fraud, cheating and forgery are also included in this precept. Professions that are seen to violate the precept against theft are working in the gambling industry or marketing products that are not actually required for the customer.

Psychology

Possible causes for acts of theft include both economic and non-economic motivations. For example, an act of theft may be a response to the offender's feelings of anger, grief, depression, anxiety and compulsion, boredom, power and control issues, low self-esteem, a sense of entitlement, an effort to conform or fit in with a peer group, or rebellion. Theft from work may be attributed to factors that include greed, perceptions of economic need, support of a drug addiction, a response to or revenge for work-related issues, rationalization that the act is not actually one of stealing, response to opportunistic temptation, or the same emotional issues that may be involved in any other act of theft. Grotius and Pufendorf upheld the principle that a person in extreme and unavoidable need, who took from the surpluses of property holders, was not guilty of the crime of theft.

The most common reasons for shoplifting include participation in an organized shoplifting ring, opportunistic theft, compulsive acts of theft, thrill-seeking, and theft due to need. Studies focusing on shoplifting by teenagers suggest that minors shoplift for reasons including the novelty of the experience, peer pressure, the desire to obtain goods that a minor cannot legally purchase, and for economic reasons, as well as self-indulgence and rebellion against parents.

See also

 Anti-theft system
 Asset management (corporate theft prevention)
 Confidence trick
 Credit card fraud
 Dishonesty
 Fence (criminal)
 Force-initiation
 Fraud
 Gentleman thief
 Larceny
 Money laundering
 Organized crime
 Pickpocketing
 Package pilferage
 Plagiarism
 Property is theft!
 Secret profit
 Skimming (casinos)
 Taxation as theft
 Theft Act
 Usufruct
 White-collar crime

Specific forms of theft and other related offences

 Art theft
 Attention theft
 Bank robbery
 Bandwidth theft
 Bloody Code
 Brandjacking
 Carjacking
 Computer crime
 Confidence trick
 Economic Espionage Act of 1996
 Embezzlement
 Espionage
 Extortion
 Identity theft
 Kidnapping
 Laptop theft
 Metal theft
 Motor vehicle theft
 Organized retail crime
 Package pilferage
 Phishing
 Piracy
 Plagiarism
 Quackery
 Receipt of stolen property
 Ripoff
 Sperm theft
 Street sign theft
 Tax evasion
 Theft of services
 Theft by finding
 Electricity theft

Notes

References
 Allen, Michael. Textbook on Criminal Law. Oxford University Press, Oxford. (2005) .
 Criminal Law Revision Committee. 8th Report. Theft and Related Offences. Cmnd. 2977
 Green, Stuart P. Thirteen Ways to Steal a Bicycle: Theft Law in the Information Age. Harvard University Press, Cambridge, MA (2012). 
 Griew, Edward. Theft Acts 1968 & 1978, Sweet & Maxwell. 
 Ormerod, David. Smith and Hogan Criminal Law, LexisNexis, London. (2005) 
 Maniscalco, Fabio, Theft of Art (in Italian), Naples – Massa (2000) 
 Smith, J. C. Law of Theft, LexisNexis: London. (1997) .

External links